Brandonville is a town in northern Preston County, West Virginia, United States. The population was 136 at the 2020 census. It is part of the Morgantown metropolitan area.

History
Brandonville was laid out in 1827 by Jonathan Brandon, and named for him.

The Hagans Homestead was listed on the National Register of Historic Places in 1993.

Geography
Brandonville is located at  (39.666321, -79.621517).

Demographics

2010 census
At the 2010 census there were 101 people, 47 households, and 29 families living in the town. The racial makeup of the town was 95.0% White and 5.0% from other races. Hispanic or Latino of any race were 5.0%.

Of the 47 households 23.4% had children under the age of 18 living with them, 42.6% were married couples living together, 14.9% had a female householder with no husband present, 4.3% had a male householder with no wife present, and 38.3% were non-families. 31.9% of households were one person and 17.1% were one person aged 65 or older. The average household size was 2.15 and the average family size was 2.62.

The median age in the town was 41.9 years. 17.8% of residents were under the age of 18; 6% were between the ages of 18 and 24; 28.7% were from 25 to 44; 23.8% were from 45 to 64; and 23.8% were 65 or older. The gender makeup of the town was 47.5% male and 52.5% female.

2000 census
At the 2000 census there were 102 people, 41 households, and 28 families living in the town. The population density was 259.3 inhabitants per square mile (101.0/km). There were 46 housing units at an average density of 116.9 per square mile (45.5/km).  The racial makeup of the town was 97.06% White, and 2.94% from two or more races.
Of the 41 households 26.8% had children under the age of 18 living with them, 46.3% were married couples living together, 17.1% had a female householder with no husband present, and 31.7% were non-families. 29.3% of households were one person and 17.1% were one person aged 65 or older. The average household size was 2.49 and the average family size was 3.04.

The age distribution was 25.5% under the age of 18, 6.9% from 18 to 24, 23.5% from 25 to 44, 21.6% from 45 to 64, and 22.5% 65 or older. The median age was 39 years. For every 100 females, there were 85.5 males. For every 100 females age 18 and over, there were 85.4 males.

The median household income was $28,125 and the median family income  was $25,000. Males had a median income of $61,875 versus $17,917 for females. The per capita income for the town was $22,118. There were 17.6% of families and 24.5% of the population living below the poverty line, including 58.8% of under eighteens and 32.0% of those over 64.

Notable person
 George Bird Evans, noted illustrator, mystery novelist, gunning and bird dog writer, and dog breeder.

References

Towns in Preston County, West Virginia
Towns in West Virginia
Morgantown metropolitan area
1827 establishments in Virginia